Wilhelm Carl Friedrich Sauer (23 March 1831 – 9 April 1916) was a German pipe organ builder. One of the famous organ builders of the Romantic period, Sauer and his company W. Sauer Orgelbau built over 1,100 organs during his lifetime, amongst them the organs at Bremen Cathedral, Leipzig's St. Thomas Church, and Berlin Cathedral, which is considered to be "his final great masterpiece".

Early years
Wilhelm Sauer was born in Schönbeck, in the Grand Duchy of Mecklenburg-Strelitz, the son of blacksmith and self-educated organ builder Ernst Sauer (1799–1873) from Karlsburg in Pomerania, and his wife Johanna Christine, née Sumke (1800–1882). His parents married in 1822. He was the brother of Johann Ernst Sauer (1823–1842). When Wilhelm was seven years old, the family moved to the neighboring town of Friedland, where his father built a factory and started the commercial organ business. Wilhelm spent his youth there, attending school, with the idea that he would transfer to the Berlin Academy. However, when his older brother Johann died in December 1842, it was decided that Wilhelm would be the one to inherit his father's business and continue the work he had started building organs. Wilhelm received an early education about organ building from his father. He left home in 1848 to further his education in this business, including studying with E.F. Walcker (1851–1853) in Ludwigsburg and with Aristide Cavaillé-Coll in Paris.

Career
In 1855, Sauer took over the management of the German crown branch in his father's factory, which had been opened there for the Prussian market in order to avoid customs duties. On 1 March 1856 Sauer finally opened his own business as Wilhelm Sauer, organ builder in Frankfurt (Oder), which grew quickly with temporary branches in Königsberg (1860). International orders soon followed. By 1882, he had completed 380 organs. In 1883, Sauer was awarded the Distinction of Akademischer Künstler and the following year, on 18 April 1884, he was named by the cabinet as "Royal Organ Builder".

In his lifetime, Wilhelm Sauer and his staff built more than 1,100 organs. His largest and most famous organs are, amongst others, in Berlin Cathedral (1903, IV/113), Thomaskirche in Leipzig (1888/1908, III/88), and in Görlitz City Hall (1910, IV.72). Two of his 1897 organs are in Namibia: one in Windhoek's Christ Church and another in Swakopmund's Lutheran Church. In 1910, Sauer sold the company to his longtime manager and deputy Paul Walcker, son of E. F. Walcker.

At least 10 of his organs were installed in Latvia.

Personal life
He married Minna Auguste Penske in 1859, the daughter of a cantor, and the couple had a daughter named Johanna (1859–1887). His wife died in 1876. On 7 September 1878, he married his second wife Anna Bauer (18 January 1848 – 11 August 1924). She was the daughter of a brewery owner and member of the city council in Potsdam. They had two sons: Wilhelm (1879–1962) and Franz Gustav Adolf (1883–1945 missing). His grandson, Wolfgang Sauer (1920–1989), went to the United States in 1964 and became a professor of German history at the University of California, Berkeley. Wilhelm Sauer's grave stone is now in Kleistpark in Frankfurt (Oder), where he died.

Notable works

Further reading

References

1831 births
1916 deaths
People from the Kingdom of Prussia
German pipe organ builders
People from Schönebeck
Musical instrument manufacturing companies of Germany